Aloo paratha (Urdu: , Hindi: , Punjabi: ਆਲੂ ਪਰਾਠਾ / آلو پراٹھا) is a paratha (flat bread dish) stuffed with potato, originating from the Punjab region of South Asia. It is traditionally eaten for breakfast. 

It is made using unleavened dough rolled with a mixture of mashed potato and spices (amchur, garam masala,) which is cooked on a hot tawa with butter or ghee. Aloo paratha is usually served with butter, chutney, curd, or Indian pickles. It is also often accompanied with sarson ka saag.

Stuffed with potato and fried makes it of higher calorie (290-360 calories) than a typical roti (60 calories). 

In the 21st century, due to convenience, working routines and rising household incomes, smaller families and time restrictions, the aloo paratha breakfast for urban Indians has been increasingly replaced by foods seen as more convenient such as cereals. A similar pattern has been observed among Central Valley Sikhs in America.

See also
 List of bread dishes
 Pakistani cuisine
 Punjabi cuisine

References

External links

Flatbread dishes
Pakistani breads
Indian cuisine
Punjabi cuisine
Kashmiri cuisine
Bangladeshi cuisine
Bengali cuisine
Rajasthani cuisine
Gujarati cuisine
Sindhi cuisine
Indo-Caribbean cuisine
Guyanese cuisine
Surinamese cuisine
Trinidad and Tobago cuisine
Potato_pancakes